The Mildred E. Mathias Botanical Garden is a  botanical garden located on the southeastern corner of the University of California, Los Angeles (UCLA) campus, California, United States. It is named after Mildred Esther Mathias Hassler (1906–1995), a noted American botanist. The director is Victoria Sork.

History
UCLA's botanical garden was started as an academic laboratory shortly after the Westwood, Los Angeles campus opened in 1929, on seven acres preserved for that purpose near the arroyo on the east side of the campus. It was funded in part by the California State Relief Administration, created by newly elected Governor Frank Merriam in 1933 to provide jobs through municipal work projects. The garden's first manager, George C. Groenewegen, started with horticultural donations from the United States Department of Agriculture and the Huntington Botanical Gardens, among others. By 1947 the garden hosted approximately 1,500 different species and varieties of plants. In the 1960s, garden director Mildred E. Mathias, who oversaw the garden from 1956 to 1974, helped to develop it into the "university garden" and opened it for public tours. "The nest," a small amphitheater designed and built by the garden's staff and volunteers out of Northern Californian incense cedar and boulders shipped from Duarte, California, was opened in 1996.

Collections
Because the garden is frost-free it can accommodate tropical and sub-tropical plants, including special collections of ferns, palms, eucalyptus and figs.  The eucalyptus and figs were brought to the garden during its early years, before they became widespread in the Los Angeles region. Plants are arranged by geographic, taxonomic or cultural needs to demonstrate to students and visitors how specimens are related to one another. They are also organized by themes, including desert plants, aquatic plants, Mediterranean-climate shrubs, and native Hawaiian plants, among others.

Notable specimens
The garden includes a large dawn redwood (Metasequoia glyptostroboides), an endangered species.

Gallery

See also 

 List of botanical gardens in the United States
 California native plants
 South Coast Botanic Garden
 Santa Barbara Botanic Garden
 California Botanic Garden
 Manhattan Beach Botanic Garden

References

External links
 The Mildred E. Mathias Botanical Garden - Official website

Botanical gardens in California
Arboreta in California
Parks in Los Angeles
Landmarks in Los Angeles
Landmarks in California
University of California, Los Angeles
Westwood, Los Angeles